Joseph or Joe Walsh may refer to:

Public officials
Joseph Charles Walsh (1868–1960), Canadian lawyer, judge, journalist and legislator from Quebec
Joseph Walsh (Massachusetts politician) (1875–1946), American jurist and congressman, 1915–1922
Joseph T. Walsh (1930–2014), American jurist from Delaware
Joe Walsh (Irish politician) (1943–2014), Irish legislator and cabinet member
Joe Walsh (Illinois politician) (born 1961), American congressman

Sportsmen
Joe Walsh (AA infielder) (1864–1911), American baseball shortstop/second baseman
Joe Walsh (catcher) (1886–1967), American baseball catcher
Joe Walsh (NL infielder) (1917–1996), American baseball shortstop
Joseph Walsh (rugby league) (1944–2008), English footballer at wing for Leigh and Great Britain
Joe Walsh (rugby league) (born 1988), English rugby league player for Huddersfield Giants
Joe Walsh (footballer, born 1992), Welsh footballer for Lincoln City
Joe Walsh (rugby union) (born 1993), New Zealand rugby union player for Blues and Southland
Joe Walsh (footballer, born 2002), English football goalkeeper for Queens Park Rangers

Others
Joseph Walsh (bishop) (1888–1972), Irish Roman Catholic prelate
Joseph L. Walsh (1895–1973), American mathematician
Joe Walsh (born 1947), American singer, songwriter and guitarist
Joseph Walsh (designer) (born 1979), Irish designer and furniture maker

See also

Walsh (surname)
Joseph Walshe (1886–1956), Irish Minister for Foreign Affairs
Joseph N. Welch (1890–1960), American lawyer in Army–McCarthy hearings